Brisaster tasmanicus is a species of sea urchins of the family Schizasteridae. Their armour is covered with spines. Brisaster tasmanicus was first scientifically described in 1974 by McKnight.

References 

tasmanicus
Animals described in 1974